USS Wanka was a United States Navy motorboat probably in commission from ca. 1912 to ca. 1919.

USS Wanka was a wooden motorboat believed to have been built about 1901. She is carried on the Navy Lists of the period from 1912 to 1919 under "miscellaneous craft." She served with the Louisiana Naval Militia before the United States entered World War I in 1917, and operated in the New Orleans, Louisiana, vicinity, probably for her entire career. She was dropped from the Navy List on 1 July 1920.

References

Patrol vessels of the United States Navy
1901 ships
World War I patrol vessels of the United States